Aurora Seranaj (born 14 May 1982) is an Albanian footballer who currently plays for  Lazio and the Albania national team  However, the first goal of the women's team was scored by Aurora Seranaj, who hit the target after 30 minutes following the development of a corner. She has been Captain since the team was founded in 2011.

Career
Seranaj was part of the inaugural Albania national women's team that faced Macedonia on 4 May 2011, where she captained the side and also scored the first goal in the nation's history. Aurora Seranaj was the first captain of Albania National team.

See also
List of Albania women's international footballers

References

External links 
 

1982 births
Living people
Albanian women's footballers
Expatriate women's footballers in Italy
Expatriate footballers in North Macedonia
Women's association football midfielders
Footballers from Tirana
Albanian footballers
Albania women's international footballers
KFF Tirana AS players